Srikanth Krishnaswamy Iyengar is an Indian actor and director who works in Telugu-language films. He is a medical doctor by profession and turned actor due to passion towards the acting. Srikanth has acted in films like Veerapan, Dear Comrade, Mehabooba, Coronavirus, Disha Encounter, Murder and Amaram Akhilam Prema. He is widely known for his role in the film Brochevarevarura.

Filmography

Films
All films are in Telugu, unless otherwise noted.

As director
April Fool (2014)

Television

References

External links

21st-century Indian male actors
Year of birth missing (living people)
Living people
Indian male film actors
Male actors in Telugu cinema